The Windward Performance DuckHawk is an American mid-wing, single-seat, 15-metre class glider, that was designed and produced by Windward Performance of Bend, Oregon. It first flew in 2011.

Since 2016 the aircraft has been no longer advertised as available by the manufacturer.

Design and development
The DuckHawk is a development of the Windward Performance SparrowHawk and is intended as a higher performance glider than its predecessor, with very high structural limits and Vne. The DuckHawk has less than 10% parts commonality with the SparrowHawk. It features a cantilever wing, a single-seat enclosed cockpit under a bubble canopy and retractable monowheel gear.

The aircraft is made from preimpregnated carbon fiber.

Operational history
By December 2016 four examples had been registered in the United States with the Federal Aviation Administration, including three "V" models and one "E" model.

Variants
DuckHawk E
Electric motorglider version, first example registered with the FAA in 2011.
DuckHawk V (Veloce)
The first example was registered with the FAA in 2014 and three have been built.
DuckHawk SV (Super Veloce)
None completed.
DuckHawk VNX
None completed.

Specifications (DuckHawk V)

See also

References

External links
Official website archives on Archive.org

2010s United States sailplanes
Aircraft first flown in 2011